The Roxby Council, formerly  Roxby Downs Council  and before that the Municipal Council of Roxby Downs, is the local government area covering the town of Roxby Downs and the Olympic Dam mine in South Australia. It has an area of 110 km².  At the 2016 census, it had a population of 3884.  The municipality was constituted on 15 May 1986. It is a unique local government area in South Australia, in that is does not have an elected council but is served by an Administrator who performs all the functions of a Council.

It covers most of the locality of Roxby Downs, except a portion to the east of the town, while also including a section of the adjacent locality of Olympic Dam.

See also
Local government areas of South Australia
List of parks and gardens in rural South Australia

References

External links
 

Roxby Downs
Far North (South Australia)